Madeleine Astrid Gurdon, Baroness Lloyd-Webber (born 30 November 1962) is an English horsewoman. She is married to theatrical impresario Andrew Lloyd Webber.

Early life
Madeleine "Gurtie" Gurdon was born in 1962 into a military family, one of four sisters. Her father, uncle and grandfather were all in the Black Watch, as was her mother's father.

Her father, Adam Gurdon, retired as a brigadier, before his marriage serving in Korea and later in Kenya during the Mau Mau Uprising. As a married man, he took his family around the world, including Cyprus, Tanganyika, and Hong Kong. Madeleine Gurdon was educated at a convent school.

Career
Madeleine Gurdon was an equestrian competitor for nearly a decade, riding in three-day events, which require the same horse and rider pair to demonstrate skill in dressage, showjumping, and cross-country riding. In the 1980s she competed internationally, coming second at the Burghley Horse Trials in 1988. To supplement her riding career, Gurdon designed an exclusive country-wear company that featured leather and suede clothing  called The Done Thing, after her favourite dun horse.

She began to breed and train thoroughbreds for flat racing. She owns and supervises two stud farms: Watership Down Stud near her English home in Sydmonton Court, and Kiltinan Castle stud in Ireland. Dar Re Mi is one of her successful broodmares.

She and her husband set up the Watership Down Polo Club; their children play polo. In 2007 she allowed a group from St Bart's, a local school, to practise there, subsidising their training. The state school team went on to beat fee-paying schools such as Rugby and Cheltenham Ladies College in the Schools and Universities Polo Association Cup. Gurdon then commissioned family friend Emerald Fennell to write a rom-com loosely based on this.

In 2010 she became president of the Pony Club, which she has been involved with all her life. According to Companies House, as of 2021 she has roles in eight companies, including as a director in her husband's Really Useful Group. She is the only woman on the board of Newbury Racecourse.

Personal life
Gurdon married Andrew Lloyd Webber at his Hampshire home, Sydmonton Court, on 9 February 1991. The couple met through his Watership Down neighbours, who loved horses. 

They have three children together: Alastair (born 1992), William (born 1993) and Isabella (born 1996). The family divides its time between properties in London and Hampshire.

References

1962 births
Living people
British female equestrians
Place of birth missing (living people)
Lloyd Webber family
Spouses of life peers
Wives of knights
Lloyd-Webber
British businesspeople
Horse breeders